Joke Falls is a 2004 Indian Kannada-language comedy movie, directed by Ashok Patil and produced by Atlanta Nagendra. Music was composed by Mano Murthy.
 The movie is a remake of 1975 Hindi movie Chupke Chupke which itself remake of 1971 Bengali movie Chhadmabeshi.

Production
Director Patil devised the basic plot of the story from the Hindi movie Chupke Chupke and reworked it to give it a fresh look. Patil then recruited Ramesh to act in the film. Newcomer Neethu was chosen to play the female lead. 
 Deepali who had previously acted in Nanna Preethiya Hudugi was chosen to play the second female lead.

Plot
Botany professor Anant Patil falls in love with Sulekha and marries her to the dismay of Sulekha's brother in law, Raghav Joshi. Raghav refuses to attend the wedding. But Anant decides to turn the tables on Raghav and teach him a lesson.

Cast
 Ramesh Aravind as Anant Patil, botany professor
 Neethu as Sulekha
 Deepali as Vasudha
 Sudha Belawadi
 Dileep as Sukumar
 Pallavi as Kamala
 Sharan as N. A. Prashanth, Close friend of Ananth
 H. G. Dattatreya as Raghavendra Joshi, a lawyer
 Jayalakshmi
 Nagarathna 
 Lamboo Nagesh 
 Sanketh Kashi
 Nagashekar 
 Shivaram (kulla) 
 Micheal Madhu 
 Sihi Kahi Chandru 
 M. S. Umesh

Soundtrack

The music is scored by Mano Murthy and was big hit.

Reception
Joke falls received positive reviews from critics as well as audiences.

Box office
Joke falls was released on 3 December 2004. The film received a good response, and ran for a hundred days in Bangalore.
 It was the first Kannada movie to run for twenty five weeks in PVR Cinemas in Bangalore.

The movie also saw screenings in Australia, Canada, and the United States.

References 

2004 films
2000s Kannada-language films
Films scored by Mano Murthy
Kannada remakes of Bengali films